I Shall Succeed is a Taiwanese Hokkien television drama that began airing on SET Taiwan in Taiwan on 19 September 2007, from Mondays to Fridays at 8 pm, and ends on 25 June 2008, with a total of 201 episodes.

It stars Chien Pei En, Ya Chian Zhen, Lee Lee-zen and Huo Zhengqi, and deals with make-up industry.

Broadcast
The series was broadcast on SET Taiwan in Taiwan on 19 September 2007 to 20 November 2008.

Cast

References
–

Sanlih E-Television original programming
Taiwanese drama television series
2007 Taiwanese television series debuts
2008 Taiwanese television series endings
Hokkien-language television shows